Alfred Burvill was an Australian politician. He was a member of the Western Australian Legislative Council representing the North-East Province from his election on 22 May 1922 until his retirement in 1928. Burvill was a member of the Country Party.

References 

Members of the Western Australian Legislative Council
20th-century Australian politicians